The Formica Building is a mixed-use building in Cincinnati, Ohio.

History
The building opened in 1970 and was designed by Chicago architect Harry Weese, perhaps best known for designing the Metro stations in Washington, D.C. The building contains both an office tower and arcade connecting Fourth Street with Fifth Street as well as providing access to the Cincinnati's Skywalk. The building originally contained the Contemporary Arts Center (CAC) and at the time, was the largest exhibition venue devoted to contemporary art in the United States. Prior to moving to the Lois & Richard Rosenthal Center for Contemporary Art in 2003, the CAC featured work by noteworthy artists such as Robert Morris, Jennifer Bartlett and Maya Angelou.

Until recently, the space formerly known as the Contemporary Arts Center has remained vacant. Recognizing the need for a unique venue in downtown Cincinnati, MCA Center worked with Cincinnati designers to reinvent the space's identity as The Center.

See also
Harry Weese
Washington Metro
Rosenthal Center for Contemporary Art

References

External links
 University of Cincinnati DAAP Library Media Collection website
 The Center website

Skyscraper office buildings in Cincinnati
Harry Weese buildings
1970 establishments in Ohio
Buildings and structures completed in 1970